Amaka Ogoegbunam (born 3 March 1990) is a Nigerian sprinter. She competed in the 400 metres hurdles event at the 2015 World Championships in Athletics in Beijing, China.

Doping ban
Ogoegbunam tested positive for the anabolic steroid metenolone at the 2009 African Junior Athletics Championships in sample collected on 31 July 2009. Before the analyse of the sample was completed she competed at the 2009 World Championships in Athletics in Berlin, where she also tested positive for the same steroid in a sample collected on 18 August. She subsequently received a 3-year doping ban from sports, at the age of 19. The ban ended 30 July 2012.

International competitions

References

External links

1990 births
Living people
Doping cases in athletics
Nigerian female hurdlers
Nigerian sportspeople in doping cases
World Athletics Championships athletes for Nigeria
Place of birth missing (living people)
Athletes (track and field) at the 2016 Summer Olympics
Olympic athletes of Nigeria
African Games gold medalists for Nigeria
African Games medalists in athletics (track and field)
Athletes (track and field) at the 2015 African Games
21st-century Nigerian women